The Joshua Green River is a stream,  long, in the Aleutians East Borough of the U.S. state of Alaska. It flows generally northwest across the Izembek National Wildlife Refuge from its source in the Aleutian Range of the Alaska Peninsula into Moffet Lagoon, Bristol Bay, on the Bering Sea.

See also
List of rivers of Alaska

References

External links
Joshua Green River fish survey – U.S. Fish and Wildlife Service

Rivers of Aleutians East Borough, Alaska
Rivers of Alaska